Frank Fertitta may refer to:

 Frank Fertitta Jr. (1938–2009), American entrepreneur
 Frank Fertitta III (born 1962), American entrepreneur